Kamandan (also Romanized as Kamandān) is a village in Pachehlak-e Gharbi Rural District, in the Central District of Azna County, Lorestan Province, Iran. At the 2006 census, its population was 729, in 136 families.

References 

Towns and villages in Azna County